Van Velsen, Van Velzen, and Van Velze are Dutch toponymic surname referring to the town Velsen in North Holland. People with these surnames include:

Van Velsen
Gerard van Velsen (died 1296), Dutch noble
Jaap van Velsen (1921–1990), Dutch-born British anthropologist
Jacob Jansz van Velsen (1597–1656), Dutch painter
Koen van Velsen (born 1952), Dutch architect
Ria van Velsen (born 1937), Dutch gymnast
Ria van Velsen (born 1943), Dutch backstroke swimmer
Wilma van Velsen (born 1964), Dutch butterfly and freestyle swimmer
Van Velzen
Bryony van Velzen (born 1996), Dutch racing cyclist
Christiaan van Velzen (born 1932), Olympic shooter from the Netherlands
Dick van Velzen, Dutch pathologist involved in the Alder Hey organs scandal
Gyliano van Velzen (born 1994), Dutch football forward
Ilse and Femke van Velzen (born 1980), Dutch documentary filmmakers
Krista van Velzen (born 1974), Dutch politician
Peter van Velzen (born 1958), Dutch footballer
Roel van Velzen (born 1978), Dutch singer-songwriter better known as VanVelzen
 (born 1943), Dutch politician, CDA Party Chair 1987-1994
Van Velze
Gerrit-Jan van Velze (born 1988), South African rugby player
Thoden van Velzen
Bonno Thoden van Velzen (born 1933), Dutch anthropologist, Surinamist and Africanist

References

Dutch-language surnames
Surnames of Dutch origin
Toponymic surnames

nl:Van Velzen